This is a list of various international institutes teaching full-time, part-time and short-term programs in political management. Political science, political economics, political history may be used by various institutions to represent similar topics.

 Harvard Institute of Politics
 Institute for Advanced Strategic and Political Studies
 Institute of Parliamentary and Political Law
 Robert J. Dole Institute of Politics
 University of Moral and Political Science.
 The Fund for American Studies
 Institute for International Political Studies
 International Republican Institute
 Institute of Political Science of SAS
 Hinckley Institute of Politics
 The Robert Day School, The Lowe Institute of Political Economy
 Soros Foundation
 The Institute of World Politics
 Institute of Socio-Political Research
 Vertical Politics Institute
 Brown University
 Moscow State Institute of International Relations
 Askew Institute on Politics and Society
 Pepperdine School of Public Policy
 Beijing International Studies University
 S. Rajaratnam School of International Studies
 Gokhale Institute of Politics and Economics
 Graduate Institute of International and Development Studies
 Institute for Politics, Democracy & the Internet
 George Washington University Graduate School of Political Management

Political science